Rugby league is the most popular winter sport in the Australian state of Queensland. 

Prior to the introduction of rugby league, rugby union was the state's most popular sport. After the introduction of League in 1908 it became popular as rugby footballers became increasingly professional. The Queensland Rugby League was the most popular competition until the best players started leaving for New South Wales.  

Queensland is home to four professional clubs, the Brisbane Broncos, Gold Coast Titans and North Queensland Cowboys and expansion team The Dolphins all participating in the National Rugby League. The Broncos are the oldest and most popular in the state, being established in 1988 and records the highest annual revenue of all NRL clubs Along with financial competitiveness, the Broncos have been voted one of Australia's most popular and most watched football teams, and has one of the highest average attendances of any rugby league club in the world; 33,337 in the 2012 NRL season.

History

Rugby Football in Queensland

The earliest record of rugby football being played in Queensland is in 1876, when the Brisbane Football Club, formed in 1866 to play 'Victorian Rules', commenced playing according to the recently codified Rugby (Union) rules, to fit in with two newly formed football clubs (Rangers and Bonnet Rouge), before reverting to Australian Rules (with occasional Rugby matches) in 1879. The Queensland Rugby Union was subsequently constituted as the Northern Rugby Union in 1883, and a year later the first organised club competition took place in Brisbane. By 1887, the switch of private schools to rugby and regular contests between Queensland and New South Wales saw rugby's popularity overtake the Australian code, resulting in its complete demise in the colony by 1892.

Introduction of Rugby League and impact of Professionalism

On 16 May 1908 the first game of rugby league was played in the state when the touring New Zealand team played Queensland at the Brisbane Exhibition Ground. 

The advent of professional rugby league in New South Wales saw many Queensland rugby players leaving for Sydney to play rugby league.

First Competitions

In 1908, the Queensland Rugby Union banned its players from going to Sydney to play rugby league, which resulted in disgruntled players forming the Queensland Amateur Rugby Football League (QARFL) (later renamed Queensland Rugby League). The new organisation was attacked by the local press and the QRU for introducing professionalism, which they claimed would destroy the sport. The first official club competition kicked off in Brisbane on May 8, 1909.

The league put down strong roots in the bush and in working class communities and these areas are still the heartland of the modern game of rugby league. Between 1914 and 1918 some major rugby union clubs switched to rugby league. By 1920, rugby union ceased to exist in Queensland. 

In 1922 the Brisbane Rugby Football League (BRFL, later BRL) was formed out of dissatisfaction with the way the QRL ran the game. Those involved took particular exception to the salary being earned by Harry Sunderland as secretary of the QRL. It remained the premier competition in Queensland for 75 years and the premier level of rugby league in the state until 1988. 

By the late-1970s, crowds began to desert the BRL competition. Clubs found themselves in financial hardship, and the public began to support the Sydney competition which by then was being broadcast in Queensland. However, a small resurgence in the popularity of the Brisbane competition occurred after Queensland dominated the Interstate Series under new State of Origin rules. A statewide top tier short-format competition similar to the NSWRL's Amco Cup - the Winfield State League would run in parallel to the BRL competition from 1982 to 1995.

Demise of the BRL into a Second Tier Competition
From 1909 to 1987, the Queensland Rugby Football League Premiership and the Brisbane Rugby League were considered to be top tier competitions parallel to the NSWRL premiership. This changed when, in 1988, the newly formed Brisbane Broncos and the Gold Coast-Tweed Giants joined the New South Wales Rugby League premiership. This led to the Brisbane Rugby League premiership being considered by most senior rugby league historians to have become a second-tier league in this year, as almost all of the top players in the competition left to play for either of the two new Queensland franchises in the NSWRL, including Wally Lewis, Gene Miles, Colin Scott, Joe Kilroy, Bryan Niebling, Greg Conescu, and Greg Dowling who all joined the QRL's original bid, the Brisbane Broncos.

Local Competitions after the NSWRL Expansion
After the Broncos and Giants joined the NSWRL, the Brisbane Rugby League, along with its companion statewide competition the Winfield State League, remained, at least officially, first tier competitions. Both competitions eventually merged with each other into the statewide Queensland Cup in 1996, and after existing as a short post-season tournament to find a Brisbane champion in 1996 and 1997, the BRL was officially disbanded after 75 seasons in 1997.

The Brisbane Rugby League (2001) was re-established as a third-tier competition below the NRL and Queensland Cup. This completed a remarkable fall from grace for the local Brisbane competition in stature, from a top level competition alongside the NSWRL until 1987, to a second-tier league from 1988 to 1997 and then a third-tier league from 2001, although most BRL clubs joined the Queensland Cup exclusively  in 1998 and their reserve grade teams compete in the current BRL competition along with community clubs.

Governing body

The Queensland Rugby League (QRL) is the governing body for the sport of rugby league in Queensland. It is a member of the Australian Rugby League (ARL) and selects the members of Queensland State of Origin teams.

National Rugby League

The National Rugby League (NRL) is Australia's top-level competition for the sport of rugby league.

The first Queensland teams joined the New South Wales Rugby League Premiership (the forerunner to the NRL) in 1988, which ultimately led to the downfall of the local Brisbane Premiership. These teams to begin play in the NSWRL were the Brisbane Broncos and Gold Coast-Tweed Giants. Following this, the NSWRL expanded again in 1995, changing its name to the Australian Rugby League (ARL) to reflect the growth of the competition from a state based league into  creating two Queensland expansion teams, the North Queensland Cowboys (Townsville) and South Queensland Crushers (Brisbane). However, the Super League War led to the demise of the South Queensland Crushers and the Gold Coast Chargers (name change of the aforementioned Giants), who were culled by the league at the end of the 1997 and 1998 seasons respectively. In 2007, after nine years, top level rugby league returned to the Gold Coast with the admission of the Gold Coast Titans to the NRL. As of 2021, there is great speculation that a second Brisbane team to finally replace the Crushers franchise of the 1990s will be added in the next few seasons. 

There are four Queensland based teams in the NRL: Brisbane Broncos, Dolphins, Gold Coast Titans, and North Queensland Cowboys.

The Gold Coast Chargers played in the 1988-1998 seasons and the South Queensland Crushers competed from 1995 to 1997.

Current

Former

Major competitions in Queensland

Queensland Cup

The Queensland Cup has been contested since 1996. Since 1998 the team winning the Queensland Cup is considered to be the premier club team in Queensland. This is because in 1996 and 1997 it was contested parallel to the Brisbane Rugby League, which was considered the premier competition in the state.

The Queensland Cup grew out of the Winfield State League. Since its formation in 1995, the Queensland Cup has been known as the Queensland Cup, Bundy Gold Cup, Channel 9 Cup. For sponsorship reasons it is currently known as the Intrust Super Cup.

FOGS Cup & FOGS Colts Challenge

Also known as the FOGS Cup & FOGS Colts Challenge, they are run by the Queensland Rugby League's South East Division. It is made up of 12 clubs, 7 of which play in the Queensland Cup. Generally, it is regarded as the division below the Queensland Cup. The FOGS Cup and FOGS Colts Challenge used to be known as the Quest Cup and Mixwell Cup, respectively.

Foley Shield

The Foley Shield competition began in North Queensland in 1948. With the introduction of the Queensland Cup in 1996 the Foley Shield competition was scrapped, only to be reintroduced in 2000. Since the revamp in 2000 it has only contested by the three largest cities in North Queensland; Cairns, Mackay and Townsville.

47th Battalion Shield 
Like the Northern Division's "Foley Shield" or the South-East Division's "Bulimba Cup" the "47th Battalion Shield" is run as the Central Region's regional Carnival and none of the teams are club teams, with the only exception being some of the Women's teams. Its traditionally held over one weekend and normally at one venue with multiple grounds to play on.

Local Competitions 
There are over 250 clubs in Queensland, across over 20 competitions administered by five regions, these being:

 Central Queensland Capras
 North Queensland Marlins
 South East Poinsettias
 South West Queensland Mustangs
 Wide Bay Bulls

Past competitions

The Brisbane Rugby League (BRL) premiership was the premier competition in Queensland from 1909 until 1997. It was superseded by the Queensland Cup.
The Bulimba Cup was a representative competition contested between Brisbane, Ipswich and Toowoomba. It was contested between 1925 and 1972.
The Winfield State League was a Queensland-wide competition that was held in a variety of formats between 1982 and 1995. This competition was superseded by the Queensland Cup.

State of Origin

The Queensland State of Origin side is by far Queensland's most loved football team. Purely a representative team, they play three games a year against New South Wales in the competition known as the State of Origin, thus named because players represent their state of birth or the state where they played their first senior game of football. They are currently captained by Daly Cherry-Evans and coached by Billy Slater.

The Queensland and New South Wales teams are heavily competitive.  During the 1980s Queensland had the upper hand (8 out of 10 to Qld); during the 1990s, factoring in Super League which took out most of the Queensland team (through the Brisbane Broncos), the results were reasonably similar (6 out of 10 to NSW); and during the first decade of the 2000s, New South Wales has had the upper hand, but are by no means dominant (4 out of 7 to NSW, with the most recent to Qld).

See also

Rugby league in Australia
Sport in Queensland

References

External links
 Queensland Rugby League
 League's Queensland page
 Queensland Rugby League History
 Rugby League clubs in Queensland
 Queensland Masters Rugby League Association inc

 
Quee